Justice Campbell may refer to:

 John Archibald Campbell, associate justice of the United States Supreme Court
 Archibald Campbell, 2nd Earl of Argyll, Lord High Chancellor of Scotland
 Colin Campbell, 1st Earl of Argyll, Lord Chancellor of Scotland
 David Campbell (judge, born 1750), associate justice of the Tennessee Supreme Court
 Dwight Campbell, associate justice of the South Dakota Supreme Court
 George W. Campbell, associate justice of the Tennessee Supreme Court
 J. R. Campbell (judge), associate justice of the Oregon Supreme Court
 James G. Campbell, associate justice of the Louisiana Supreme Court
 James U. Campbell, chief justice of the Oregon Supreme Court
 John Campbell, 1st Baron Campbell, chief justice of the Queen's Bench
 Josiah Abigail Patterson Campbell, chief justice of the Mississippi Supreme Court
 Preston W. Campbell, associate justice and chief justice of the Virginia Supreme Court of Appeals
 Ralph Abercrombie Campbell, chief justice of the Bahamas from 1960 to 1970
 Robert M. Campbell, associate justice of the Texas Supreme Court
 William Campbell (judge), chief justice of Upper Canada
 William W. Campbell (New York congressman), ex officio judge of the New York Court of Appeals
 James Lang Campbell, judge of the Supreme Court of New South Wales
 Joseph Campbell (judge), judge of the Supreme Court of New South Wales
 Michael Campbell (judge), chief judge of the Compensation Court of New South Wales
 Stephen Campbell (judge), judge of the Supreme Court of New South Wales

See also
Judge Campbell (disambiguation)